This Is Not the Target Market is the second album by New Zealand punk band Steriogram, released on February 12, 2007 by Toshiba EMI. It was their first independent release after leaving major label Capitol Records.
The song "Get Up" is used in the video game, WWE SmackDown vs. Raw 2009.

Track listing
 "Get Up" – 2:45
 "Talk About It" – 2:32
 "Own Way Home" – 2:42
 "Sitting Above Me" – 2:36
 "Wasted" – 2:41
 "Satan Is a Lady" – 3:03
 "Just Like You" – 2:22
 "Muchacha" – 3:01
 "Built on Lies (Gangster)" – 2:34
 "Kare Kare" – 3:24
Bonus tracks
<li> "Send Me Out – 2:29
<li> "Walkie Talkie Man (live)" – 2:50
<li> "Satan Is a Lady (live)" – 3:10
<li> "Roadtrip (live)" – 7:32

Personnel
 Tyson Kennedy - lead vocals
 Brad Carter - co-lead vocals and lead guitar
 Tim Youngson - rhythm guitar and backing vocals
 Jake Adams - bass guitar and backing vocals
 Jared Wrennall - drum kit and backing vocals

Release history

References

Steriogram albums
2006 albums